Nathan Paul Broadhead (born 5 April 1998) is a Welsh professional footballer who plays as a forward for Ipswich Town. He was a Wales Under-21 international.

Club career

Everton
Broadhead joined Everton at the age of 10 from Wrexham. On 6 December 2017, Broadhead was named in Everton's first team squad for the Europa League match away to Apollon Limassol. A day later, he made his first-team debut, coming on as an 82nd-minute substitute and flicking on for Nikola Vlašić's goal in a 3–0 win.

On 2 August 2019, Broadhead signed a one-year contract extension until 2021, then joined Burton Albion on loan for the 2019–20 season. A day later, he made his Football League debut, coming on as a substitute in Burton's 1–0 loss to Ipswich Town. 

He made the bench for the first time in the 2020–21 season in a Premier League match against Southampton on 1 March where Everton went on to win 1–0. Broadhead subsequently made his Premier League debut away against Brighton & Hove Albion on 12 April.

In June 2021, he signed a new two-year deal with Everton. On 16 August 2021, Broadhead joined League One side Sunderland on loan until the end of the season.

On 9 August 2022, he joined Wigan Athletic on loan until the end of the 2022–23 season. This ended prematurely on 6 January 2023, when Everton recalled him.

Ipswich Town
On 9 January 2023, Broadhead joined Ipswich Town on a three-and-a-half year deal for a reported fee of £1.5m. This ended his 15-year association with Everton.

International career
Broadhead has represented Wales at various age levels, including playing for Wales U20 at the 2017 Toulon Tournament. 

On 19 May 2022, he was called up to the senior Wales squad for the  2022 FIFA World Cup qualifier play-off final against Ukraine or Scotland on 5 June 2022 and the Nations League Group A matches against Poland, Netherlands, Belgium and the Netherlands again on 1 June, 8 June, 11 June and 14 June 2022 respectively. However he later had to withdraw through injury.

Career statistics

Honours

Everton U23s
 Premier League Cup: 2018–19

Sunderland
 EFL League One play-offs: 2022

Individual
EFL League One Goal of the Month: February 2023

References

External links

1998 births
Living people
Footballers from Bangor, Gwynedd
Welsh footballers
Wales youth international footballers
Wales under-21 international footballers
Association football forwards
Bangor City F.C. players
Wrexham A.F.C. players
Everton F.C. players
Burton Albion F.C. players
Sunderland A.F.C. players
Wigan Athletic F.C. players
Ipswich Town F.C. players
English Football League players
Premier League players